The Oaks Golf Course is a public, 18-hole layout located in Cottage Grove, Wisconsin, United States. It opened in 2003. It was named one of Golf Digest magazine's "best new courses" in 2004.

The course has six par 3s, five par 5s, and nine par 4s for a total par of 71. The Oaks uses bent grass for its tees, fairways, and greens and was designed with the natural landscape in mind, according to course architect Greg Martin.

References

External links
Official site

Golf clubs and courses in Wisconsin
Buildings and structures in Dane County, Wisconsin
Tourist attractions in Dane County, Wisconsin